Native Sons is an album by the American band Los Lobos, released in 2021. Except for one track, it is a covers album, dedicated to music from Los Angeles.

The album peaked at No. 7 on Billboard'''s Americana/Folk Albums chart. It won a 2022 Grammy Award in the Best Americana Album category.

Production
The album was produced by Steve Berlin. It was recorded during the band's longest break from touring in 20 years. The title track is the only original composition. "Love Special Delivery" was originally by Thee Midniters, and was one of the first hit rock songs by a Chicano band. "The World Is a Ghetto", by War, was the band's favorite cover to record.

Critical reception

AllMusic deemed the album "essential listening from one of America's greatest bands," writing that Los Lobos make the songs their own "with the imagination, spirit, and commitment of their performances, not to mention their impressive chops and the incredible feel that comes from more than four decades of working together." The Star Tribune concluded that it "is a testament to how Los Lobos themselves are as richly varied as the city and borderland territory that birthed them." The Mercury News'' praised the cover of "Sail On, Sailor".

Track listing

References

Los Lobos albums
2021 albums
New West Records albums
Grammy Award for Best Americana Album
Covers albums